The Kamianka is a river that flows through the Dnipropetrovsk Oblast of Ukraine. Its course begins near Chervonyi Orlik.

References 

Rivers of Dnipropetrovsk Oblast